Nepenthes vieillardii (after Eugène Vieillard, collector of plants from New Caledonia and Tahiti between 1861 and 1867) is a species of pitcher plant endemic to the island of New Caledonia. Its distribution is the most easterly of any Nepenthes species. Its natural habitat is shrublands or forests, to about  altitude.

Tripteroides caledonicus mosquitoes breed in the pitchers of this species.

Infraspecific taxa

Nepenthes vieillardii var. deplanchei Dub. (1906)
Nepenthes vieillardii var. humilis (Moore) Guilliaum. (1964)
Nepenthes vieillardii var. minima Guillaum. (1953)
Nepenthes vieillardii var. montrouzieri (Dub.) Macfarl. (1908)

References

Further reading

 Bauer, U., C.J. Clemente, T. Renner & W. Federle 2012. Form follows function: morphological diversification and alternative trapping strategies in carnivorous Nepenthes pitcher plants. Journal of Evolutionary Biology 25(1): 90–102. 
 Clarke, C.M. 2006. Introduction. In: Danser, B.H. The Nepenthaceae of the Netherlands Indies. Natural History Publications (Borneo), Kota Kinabalu. pp. 1–15.
 Gibson, R. 2010. Nepenthes vieillardii in the wild. Carniflora News 1(3): 15–16. 
  Guillou-Gotkovsky, E. 1987. Observations au sujet de Nepenthes vieillardii. Dionée 12.
 Jebb, M.H.P. & M.R. Cheek 1997. A skeletal revision of Nepenthes (Nepenthaceae). Blumea 42(1): 1–106.
 Jones, P. & M. Wilson 1987.   Carnivorous Plant Newsletter 16(3): 74–82.
 Kitching, R.L. & C.J. Schofield 1986. Every pitcher tells a story. New Scientist 109(1492): 48–50.
 Kurata, K., T. Jaffré & H. Setoguchi 2003. Intraspecific differentiation of Nepenthes vieillardii Hook. f. in New Caledonia. The relationship between floral morphology and soil chemistry. Journal of Plant Research 116(supplement): 47.
 Kurata, K., T. Jaffré & H. Setoguchi 2004. Variation of pitcher morphology within Nepenthes vieillardii Hook. f. (Nepenthaceae) in New Caledonia. Acta phytotaxonomica et geobotanica 55(3): 181–197. Abstract
 Kurata, K. 2006. Intraspecific differentiation of Nepenthes vieillardii Hook.f. (Nepenthaceae) in New Caledonia. Ph.D. thesis, Kyoto University, Kyoto.
 Kurata, K., T. Jaffré & H. Setoguchi 2008. Genetic diversity and geographical structure of the pitcher plant Nepenthes vieillardii in New Caledonia: a chloroplast DNA haplotype analysis. American Journal of Botany 95(12): 1632–1644. 
 Kurata, S. 2002. ニューカレドニアの食虫植物(序). Journal of Insectivorous Plant Society 53(1).
 Lecoufle, M. 1990. Nepenthes vieillardii. In: Carnivorous Plants: Care and Cultivation. Blandford, London. pp. 126–127.
  Mansur, M. 2001.  In: Prosiding Seminar Hari Cinta Puspa dan Satwa Nasional. Lembaga Ilmu Pengetahuan Indonesia, Bogor. pp. 244–253.
 Meimberg, H., A. Wistuba, P. Dittrich & G. Heubl 2001. Molecular phylogeny of Nepenthaceae based on cladistic analysis of plastid trnK intron sequence data. Plant Biology 3(2): 164–175. 
  Meimberg, H. 2002.  Ph.D. thesis, Ludwig Maximilian University of Munich, Munich.
 Meimberg, H. & G. Heubl 2006. Introduction of a nuclear marker for phylogenetic analysis of Nepenthaceae. Plant Biology 8(6): 831–840. 
 Meimberg, H., S. Thalhammer, A. Brachmann & G. Heubl 2006. Comparative analysis of a translocated copy of the trnK intron in carnivorous family Nepenthaceae. Molecular Phylogenetics and Evolution 39(2): 478–490. 
 Mey, F.S. 2013. Nepenthes vieillardii: a lazy sunbather... Strange Fruits: A Garden's Chronicle, July 28, 2013.
 Renner, T. & C.D. Specht 2011. A sticky situation: assessing adaptations for plant carnivory in the Caryophyllales by means of stochastic character mapping. International Journal of Plant Sciences 172(7): 889–901. 

vieillardii
Carnivorous plants of the Pacific
Endemic flora of New Caledonia
Plants described in 1873